Kanhchriech is a district located in Prey Veng Province in southeastern Cambodia.

References 

Districts of Prey Veng province